Fraxinus cuspidata (fragrant ash) is a tree native to northern Mexico and the southwestern United States. It has been reported from Nuevo León, Coahuila, Chihuahua, Tamaulipas, Texas, New Mexico, Arizona and Nevada.

References

External links
photo of herbarium specimen at Missouri Botanical Garden

Trees of Nuevo León
Trees of Coahuila
Trees of Chihuahua (state)
Trees of Tamaulipas
Flora of Texas
Flora of New Mexico
Flora of Arizona
Flora of Nevada
Plants described in 1859
cuspidata
Flora without expected TNC conservation status